Cham Rud (also Romanized as Cham Rūd, Chamrud, and Chamerūd) is a village in Qarah Bolagh Rural District, Bagh Helli District, Soltaniyeh County, Zanjan Province, Iran. At the 2006 census, its population was 63, in 12 families.

References 

Populated places in Soltaniyeh County